Everett is a masculine given name. People with or referred to by the name include:

Arts and music
 Everett Phipps Babcock, architect
 Everett Barksdale, American jazz guitarist
 E. F. Bleiler, American science fiction editor
 Everett Bradley (musician), American multi-instrumentalist
 Everett B. Cole, American science fiction writer
 Everett De Morier, American writer and playwright
 Everett Garrison, maker of bamboo fly rods
 Everett M. Gilmore, American tuba player
 Everett Helm, American composer
 Everett Gee Jackson, American impressionist painter
 Everett Leroy Jones, birthname of writer Amiri Baraka
 Everett Kinstler, American artist
 Everett Lee, American conductor and violinist
 Everett Lewis, American independent filmmaker
 Everett McCorvey, American tenor, conductor, and producer
 Everett Morton, English drummer
 Everett Nourse, organist
 Everett Owens, pen name for Rob Thomas
 Everett Peck, American illustrator, comics artist, cartoonist and animator
 J. Everett Prewitt, American novelist
 Everett Robbins, American pianist and composer
 Everett Ruess, American artist, poet, and writer
 Everett S. Sherman, covered bridge builder
 Everett Shinn, American realist painter
 Everett Spruce, American painter
 Everett Titcomb, American organist and composer
 Everett True, American musician and journalist
 Everett Warner, American impressionist painter
 Everett Woods, architect

Business
 Everett M. Arnold, comic book publisher
 Everett Klipp, stock trader
 Everett F. Merrill, American businessman and city manager
 Everett Nordstrom, American businessman, chairman and CEO
 Everett Stern, American businessman and whistleblower

Film and television
 Everett Brown, American actor
 Everett De Roche, American-Australian screenwriter
 Everett Douglas, American film editor
 Everett Freeman, American screenwriter and producer
 Everett Glass, American character actor
 Everett Greenbaum, American television and film writer and actor
 Everett Eugene Grunz, birthname of American actor E. G. Marshall
 Everett Lewis, American filmmaker
 Everett McGill, American actor
 Everett Sloane, American character actor

Fictional characters
 Everett Acker, character in the Breaking Bad franchise
 Everett K. Ross, character in Marvel Comics
 Everett Thomas, alter ego of Marvel Comics character Synch
 Everett Young, a Stargate Universe character

Government, politics, and religion
 Everett O. Alldredge, American archivist
 Everett Chamberlin Benton, Massachusetts politician
 Everett Bidwell, Wisconsin politician
 Everett E. Bierman, United States Ambassador
 Everett E. Bolle, member of the Wisconsin State Assembly
 Everett H. Brant, North Dakota politician
 Everett Brown (politician), New York politician
 Everett Ellis Briggs, American diplomat
 Everett Francis Briggs, miner's activist
 Everett G. Burkhalter, California politician
 Everett A. Carpenter, former member of the New York State Assembly
 Everett Colby, New Jersey politician
 Everett Dirksen, American politician
 Everett E. Dow, member of the Wisconsin State Assembly
 Everett F. Drumright, United States Ambassador
 Everett Dunn, civil engineer and labor negotiator
 Everett Eissenstat, American government official and businessman
 Everett Gendler, American rabbi and civil rights advocate
 Everett S. Graffeo, former Presiding Patriarch
 Everett E. Hatcher, American Drug Enforcement Administration agent
 Everett Hindley, Canadian politician
 Everett Inbody, former judge of the Nebraska Court of Appeals
 Everett Johnson, former member of the Kansas House of Representatives
 Everett Holland Jones, Bishop of West Texas
 B. Everett Jordan, United States senator from North Carolina
 Everett A. Kelly, former member of the Florida House of Representatives
 Everett Kent, Pennsylvania politician
 C. Everett Koop, Surgeon General of the United States
 Everett J. Lake, Connecticut politician
 Everett LaFond, former member of the Wisconsin Senate
 Everett McDonald, Canadian politician
 E. H. McEachren, Arizona politician
 Everett J. Murphy, Illinois politician
 Everett Newcomb, Canadian politician
 Everett Osmond, Canadian politician
 Everett Parker, activist and minister
 Everett Piper, conservative commentator and former university president
 Everett Sanders, American political figure
 Everett P. Wheeler, anti-suffrage activist
 Everett Irvine Wood, Canadian politician
 Everett Riley York, law clerk and Washington politician

Military
 Everett W. Anderson, American Civil War soldier
 Everett Alvarez Jr., former United States Navy officer
 Everett Russell Bailey, United States Army physician
 Everett Ernest Blakely, United States Air Force pilot
 Everett Richard Cook, United States Army/Air Force pilot
 Everett W. Holstrom, United States Army Air Forces pilot
 Everett Hughes (general), 17th U.S. Army Chief of Ordnance
 Everett F. Larson, United States Marine killed in action and ship namesake
 Everett P. Pope, United States Marine
 Everett W. Stewart, United States Army/Air Force pilot

Scientists and scholars
 Everett Smith Beneke, American mycologist
 Everett L. Bull, American computer scientist
 Everett C. Dade, mathematician
 Everett Fahy, American art historian
 Everett Ferguson, American Christian studies scholar
 Everett Fox, Judaic and Bible studies professor
 Everett L. Fullam, Priest and biblical scholar
 Everett Peter Greenberg, American microbiologist
 Everett Carll Ladd, American political scientist
 Everett Franklin Lindquist, American education professor
 Everett Joel Hall, professor and businessman
 Everett Hall, American philosopher
 Everett F. Harrison, American theologian 
 Everett Hughes (sociologist), American sociologist
 Everett Dean Martin, American social psychologist and philosopher
 Everett Mendelsohn, American science historian
 Everett T. Moore, American librarian
 Everett C. Olson, American zoologist
 E. F. Phillips, American beekeeper
 Everett Reimer, education theorist
 Everett Rogers, American communication theorist and sociologist
 Everett K. Rowson, American Middle Eastern and Islamic studies professor
 Everett L. Shostrom, American psychotherapist
 Everett Shock, American geochemist
 Everett E. Vokes, American oncologist
 Everett J. Waring, American attorney
 Everett Worthington, clinical psychologist and professor

Sports
 Everett Bacon, American college football quarterback
 Everett Bowman, American rodeo cowboy
 Everett Bradley (athlete), American pentathlete
 Everett B. Camp, American football player and coach
 Everett Case, American basketball coach
 Everett Dawkins, American football defensive tackle
 Everett Dean, American college basketball and baseball coach
 Everett Dunklee, American cross-country skier
 Everett Ellis, American decathlon athlete
 Everett Fitzhugh, American sports broadcaster
 Everett Gay, American former football player
 Everett Golson, former American football quarterback
 Everett Kell, birth name of American baseball player Skeeter Kell
 Everett E. Kelley, American college football player
 Everett Lindsay, American football player
 Everett Little, American football player
 Everett McGowan, American ice hockey player
 Everett McIver, American former football player
 Everett McLeod, Maine politician
 Everett Moore, footballer
 Everett Nelson, Negro league baseball pitcher
 Everett Sanipass, Canadian retired ice hockey forward
 Everett Scott, American professional baseball player
 Everett Strupper, American football player
 Everett Stull, American former baseball pitcher
 Everett Sweeley, American football player and coach
 Everett Teaford, American former baseball pitcher
 Everett Withers, American football coach
 Everett Whittingham, Jamaican cricketer
 Everett Yon, American football player and coach

Others
 Everett Bridgewater, bankrobber
 Everett C. Erle, American philatelist
 Everett Farmer, Canadian murderer
 Everett Klippert, last person convicted of gross indecency for homosexual behavior in Canada

See also
 Everett (surname)
 Everette
 Everett (disambiguation)

Masculine given names